Charlie Nearburg (born September 6, 1950) is a race car driver who broke the wheel-driven land speed record in 2010.

Born in Dallas, Nearburg founded Nearburg Exploration, an oil and gas exploration firm that became one of the largest independent oil and gas explorers in the country. He used his profits from his successful business to finance his auto racing career, becoming a long time Toyota Atlantic competitor. In 1997 he drove in the 24 Hours of Le Mans in a Ferrari 333 SP for Pilot Motorsports and funded three appearances in the CART Champ Car series for Dale Coyne Racing. Coyne is particularly proud of the progress Nearburg made while with the team, stating in a 2004 interview: “Charlie Nearburg is an example I love – he was a guy that was older, he was married, he had kids and always wanted to do these races. So he came with us, and did three races, and we pushed him a little bit, but by the time he got to his third race, he was very respectable – and he’s got that to carry with him the rest of his life.” Nearburg retired from professional racing after his Champ Car experience.  He is listed as a Ferrari 250 GTO owner.

In September 2010 driving the Spirit of Rett, Nearburg broke Goldenrod's wheel-driven land speed record at a speed of 414.4 mph at the Bonneville Salt Flats using a General Motors racing V-8 engine.

Nearburg graduated from St. Mark's School of Texas in 1968  and later served on its board of trustees for 20 years. He received degrees from Dartmouth in 1972, 1973, and 1974, the latter two being engineering degrees. He later served on the engineering school's board of overseers. He has also been philanthropically involved in pediatric cancer research, environmental protection, and the arts.

Spirit of Rett

On September 21, 2010 the Spirit of Rett made two phenomenal speed runs.  The first run averaged 417 MPH with an exit speed of 422.6.  The return run, made under more difficult track conditions, averaged 411.7 MPH with a top speed of 417.65.  The average speed of approximately 414.4 MPH exceeded the 45 year old Summers brothers’ Goldenrod record.  The “Spirit of Rett” now has one of the fastest single engine car record in history.

Accomplishments
 Fastest single-engine car record in history 414.316 MPH as of September 21, 2010 (and only 3 mph less than the absolute fastest "real car" record of 417.020 MPH held by Tom Burkland)
 Fastest normally aspirated car in history (Broke 45-year-old record set by Summer's Bros. "Goldenrod" on Nov 12, 1965)
 First and only unblown single-engine car over 400 MPH
 First and only car to ever set two over 300 MPH records in one day
 First and only car to ever hold all four of the fastest unblown records at Bonneville at the same time  A/FS 379.6 MPH,  A/GS 353.825 MPH,  AA/GS 368.136 MPH,  AA/FS 392.503 MPH
 First and only car to ever hold the two fastest unblown FIA records at the same time
 At the 2011 FIA Landspeed Shootout held in September, the “Spirit of Rett” increased its FIA  Category A, Group II, Class 10  record to 366.59 MPH.

Career results

American Open-Wheel racing results

CART

24 Hours of Le Mans results

See also
Notable alumni of St. Mark's School of Texas

References

External links
 The Wall Street Journal: he Inspiration Behind a Land Speed Record
 Dallas Morning News:Dallas oilman is powering up to break 409-mph record on Bonneville Salt Flats
 Dartmouth Alumni Magazine: In The Blink of an Eye
 Land Speed Events: Charles Nearburg, Spirit of Rett, 414.316 MPH
 Jalopnik: The Spirit Of Rett: The World's Fastest Single-Engine Tribute
 Goodguys: Hot Rod Heroes - Charlie Nearburg
 Video: Charles Nearburg Breaks 45 year old Record at Bonneville
 Video: Spirit of Rett driver Charles Nearburg at Bonneville 2011
 Video: Where They Raced - Charlie Nearburg
 Video: Spirit of Rett land speed record (down run)
 Video: THIS CAR MATTERS: 1926 Bugatti Miller V8
 Video: World's Fastest Car: Spirit of Rett World Record at Bonneville Salt Flats
 Video: Spirit of Rett return run push-off
 Video: Thayer School of Engineering at Dartmouth Alumni Spotlight - Charles Nearburg
 Video: Thayer School of Engineering at Dartmouth Alumni Spotlight - Charles Nearburg on Teamwork
 Video: Thayer School of Engineering at Dartmouth - Search for Oil and Gas

1950 births
Champ Car drivers
Atlantic Championship drivers
Living people
24 Hours of Le Mans drivers
Trans-Am Series drivers
24 Hours of Daytona drivers
Bonneville 300 MPH Club members
Racing drivers from Dallas
St. Mark's School (Texas) alumni
Dartmouth College alumni
Dale Coyne Racing drivers